Konak Square is a busy square at the southern end of Atatürk Avenue in the Konak district of İzmir, Turkey. The square is the busiest part of the city, as Konak is the main place of İzmir. The square is named after the Vali Konağı (Governor's Mansion) of İzmir Province, which is located here (konak means mansion in Turkish.)

Buildings in the square

Most of this busy square is occupied by the Governorate (Governor's Konak) of İzmir Province, the City Hall of İzmir Metropolitan Municipality, the Central Bus Station, and the Yalı Mosque. At the center of the square is the İzmir Clock Tower, an old landmark built in 1901. The square is also near Kemeraltı, İzmir's major market (bazaar) district. At the southern end of the square is the Cultural Centre of Ege University, which includes an opera house, a music academy, and a museum of modern art.

See also
 Cumhuriyet Square
Konak Terminal

Resources

External links

More on the square

Squares in İzmir
İzmir
Things named after Mustafa Kemal Atatürk